Vadakkencherry is a town and gram panchayat in the Palakkad district, state of Kerala, India. It is located about 35 km from Palakkad along National Highway 544.

Education 
 College of Applied Science, Vadakkencherry
 St. Mary’s Polytechnic College, Vadakkenchery
 Cherupushpam GHSS Vadakkencherry
 Government Community College, Vadakkenchery
 The Shobha Academy
 Motherteresa School Vadakkencherry

Transportation 
Vadakkenchery has good connectivity across all major cities.It is located along National Highway 544. Public transportation is mainly through private and KSRTC bus services.A KSRTC operating centre is being operated from Vadakkenchery. There is also a private bus stand usually called as Indira Priyadarshini Bus Stand to operate private bus service. Nearest major railway stations are Palakkad Junction railway station and Thrissur railway station. Nearest airport is Cochin International Airport.

References

External links 

Cities and towns in Palakkad district